Lyle Hugh Munson (?- ) was an intelligence agent and then, later, a book publisher and distributor under the corporate name Bookmailer, Inc.. Based in the New York area, his company was known particularly for offering anti-communist works, and has been described as having been the "leading publisher of antisemitic and hate literature".

Robert W. Welch Jr., the head of the John Birch Society, considered him a "good friend". Munson's advice to the Austrian economist Ludwig von Mises for the author to threaten Yale University Press to take Human Action to another publisher because of delays caused it to rush out its flawed second edition.

Intelligence
Munson worked for the OSS starting in 1940, and in the CIA's psychological warfare division. In 1949, he testified before the Senate Internal Security Subcommittee.

Bookmailer
During the 29 years of its existence, Bookmailer published around fifty books on its own, in addition to distributing books published by small publishers. They were based in New York City, changing offices after an April 18, 1961 burglary. In 1964, they moved to Linden, New Jersey. The company was 20% owned by P. C. Beezley. Sales circa 1960 were about 200,000 volumes per year, and grew to around 2 million in 1961 off of a wave of interest in anti-communist material. Employees included Herbert Romerstein, later director of the U.S. Information Agency's Office to Counter Soviet Disinformation under the Reagan administration.

According to Russell Kirk, Bookmailer advertising was turned down by conservative journal Modern Age because his advertising agent had a Jewish name.

Books published
Attack by Mail"Communism and Your Child by Herbert RomersteinCourt of Public Opinion by Alger Hiss
An edition of Freedom from War: the United States Program for General and Complete Disarmament in a Peaceful World (Department of State publication 7277) intended to stoke protests against US moves toward disarmamentThe John Franklin Letters (inspiration for The Turner Diaries)Major Jordan's Diaries by George Racey Jordan with Richard L. Stokes (reprint edition)The World's Most Orphaned Nation'' by Joseph Cardinal Mindszenty
 A volume of speeches by US Senator Thomas J. Dodd

Personal life
Munson and his wife, Anne, moved from New Jersey to Mattoon, Illinois less than a year before his death. After he passed, Anne started her own by-mail bookselling operation, Munson Books.

References

1974 deaths